Interview Music is the ninth studio album by Scottish indie rock band Idlewild, released on 5 April 2019 on Empty Words Records. It was produced by Dave Eringa, who had worked on the band's previous albums 100 Broken Windows and The Remote Part. It reached No. 22 in the UK album charts and No.1 on the Scottish album charts.

Track listing

Personnel

Idlewild
Roddy Woomble – lead vocals, acoustic guitar 
Rod Jones – electric guitar, acoustic guitar
Colin Newton – drums, percussion
Andrew Mitchell – bass guitar, backing vocals
Luciano Rossi – piano, keyboards, backing vocals

Additional musicians

Recording personnel
Dave Eringa – producer, mixing

References

Idlewild (band) albums
Self-released albums
2019 albums
Albums recorded at Kingsize Soundlabs